Akbulut is a village in the central district of Hakkâri Province in Turkey. The village is populated by Kurds of the Mamxûran tribe and had a population of 302 in 2022.

The two hamlets of Aydın and Demirli are attached to Akbulut.

History 
The village was populated by 20 Assyrian families in 1850 and 9 families in 1877.

Population 
Population history from 2000 to 2022:

References 

Kurdish settlements in Hakkâri Province
Historic Assyrian communities in Turkey
Villages in Hakkâri District